Bladdernut is a common name for several plants and may refer to:

Staphylea, a genus of trees native to temperate regions of the Northern Hemisphere
Diospyros whyteana, a species of tree with edible fruit native to Africa